This is a list of notable demons that appear in works of fiction, not limited to writing or to entertainment purposes. For example, some are from video games and some are from Dante's Inferno.

List of theological demons covers those from religion, theology, demonology, and mythology; the sacred and its study.

Names of God, list of deities, and list of fictional deities cover God and gods in various ways. List of legendary creatures may also help explain what is not here.

Some demons may be in both the fictional and theological lists. Many demons have names with several spellings but few are listed under more than one spelling.

Every listing should include a parenthetical reference, usually one with a blue link.

A
Aamon (Devilman Crybaby)
Aatrox (League of Legends)
Abalam (The Last Exorcism)
Abaddon (multiple works)
Abi (Devilman)
Abraxas (multiple works)
Adramahlihk (Divinity: Original Sin 2)
Adversary, (The Binding of Isaac: Rebirth)
Agira (Devilman)
Agrith-Naar (RuneScape)
Aguilar (Devilman)
Agwel (Devilman)
Akira Fudo (Devilman)
Aion (Chrono Crusade)
Aku (Samurai Jack)
Alastair (Supernatural TV series)
Alastor (Dark-Hunter book series)
Alastor (Hazbin Hotel TV series)
Alastor (Painkiller video game series)
Algaliarept (Kim Harrison, Hollows print series)
Alichino (Dante's Inferno)
Amaimon (Blue Exorcist)
Amel (The Vampire Chronicles)
Amon (Devilman)
Amon (StarCraft)
Anatas (Evil U.S TV show)
Andariel (Diablo series)
Andurium (Jonathan Harker Novels)
Angel Dust (Hazbin Hotel TV series)
Annabelle (The Conjuring Universe)
Anthony (Supernatural TV series)
Anyanka (Buffy the Vampire Slayer TV series)
Anzu (Sarah Rees Brennan, The Demon's Lexicon)
Aogami (Shin Megami Tensei V)
Apophis (Chilling Adventures of Sabrina)
Apostles (Berserk)
Arachnotron (Doom video game series)
Archimonde (Warcraft series)
Archvile (Doom video game series)
Argosax (Devil May Cry 2)
Arlon (Devilman)
Artery (Darren Shan, The Demonata)
Ashtar (Catherine)
Asmodeus (multiple works)
Asmoth (Strange)
Astaroth (multiple works)
Asura (Soul Eater manga)
Aurora (Devilman)
Azal (Doctor Who TV series)
Azal (Strange)
Azazeal (Hex TV series)
Azazel (multiple works)
Azazello (Mikhail Bulgakov, The Master and Margarita)
Azmodan (Diablo and Heroes of the Storm)
Azrael (Dogma)

B
Baal (multiple works)
Babau (Dungeons & Dragons fantasy game)
Bacarra (Charmed TV series)
Backbeard (GeGeGe no Kitaro 2018)
Bad Ash (The Evil Dead films)
Baghuul (Sinister and Sinister 2)
Bahumat (Fablehaven series)
Bai Tza (Jackie Chan Adventures TV series)
Bal'lak the Pummeller (RuneScape online role-playing game)
Balnazzar (World of Warcraft franchise)
Balor (Dungeons & Dragons fantasy game)
Balrogs (J. R. R. Tolkien's The Silmarillion and The Lord of the Rings)
Balthazae (Buffy The Vampire Slayer TV series)
Balthazar (Charmed TV series)
Balthazar (Constantine)
Bambadjan (The Good Place)
The Banshee (Strange)
Baphomet (Doom video game series)
Barakiel (Lineage II)
Barbariccia (Dante's Inferno)
Barbas (Charmed TV series)
Baron of Hell (Doom video game series)
Bartel (Chilling Adventures of Sabrina)
Barthamus (Supernatural TV series)
 Ultraman Belial (Mega Monster Battle: Ultra Galaxy, Ultra Galaxy Legend Side Story: Ultraman Zero vs. Darklops Zero, Ultraman Zero: The Revenge of Belial, Ultraman Saga, Ultra Zero Fight, Ultraman Ginga, Ultraman Ginga S, Ultraman X, Ultra Series, Ultraman Retsuden, Ultraman Orb, Ultraman Geed, Ultraman R/B, Ultraman Taiga, Ultraman Z, Ultraman Trigger: New Generation Tiga, Ultra Galaxy Fight: The Abosulte Conspiracy, Various Ultra Series Video Games, Ultraman Retsuden & Ultra Galaxy Fight: The Destined Cossroad, Ultra Series)
Bartimaeus (Jonathan Stroud, Bartimaeus Trilogy)
Batibat (Chilling Adventures of Sabrina)
Bat'Zul (City of Villains)
Bawoo (Devilman)
Mrs. Baylock (The Omen)
Bearded Demon (Supernatural TV series)
The Beast (Doctor Who)
The Beast (Over The Garden Wall)
Behemoth (Mikhail Bulgakov, The Master and Margarita)
Demon Behemoth (Timm Thaler)
Be'lakor the Dark Master and other Daemons (Rick Priestley, Warhammer tabletop games)
Beelzeboss (Tenacious D in The Pick of Destiny)
Beelzebub (Demon Lord Dante)
Beelzebub (Helltaker)
Beelzebub (Umineko no Naku Koro Ni)
Beezy J. Heinous (Jimmy Two Shoes)
Bela (Devilman)
Beleth (Lineage II)
Belfagor (Belfagor arcidiavolo by Machiavelli)
Belial (Diablo series)
Belphegor (Umineko no Naku Koro Ni)
Belthazor (Charmed TV series)
Bendy (Bendy and the Ink Machine)
Berial (Devil May Cry 4)
Berry and Cherry (Sanrio, Lloromannic fantasy world), a.k.a. the Devilish Demon Duo
Betra (Devilman)
Big Horn (The Binding of Isaac: Afterbirth+)
Bill Cipher (Gravity Falls)
Black Hat (Villainous)
Blackheart (Marvel Comics)
Blades (Devil May Cry)
Blitzo (Helluva Boss)
Bojack (Dragon Ball Z: Bojack Unbound)
The Boogeyman, (Boogeyman)
BSD Daemon a.k.a. Beastie (Berkeley Software Distribution)
Brady (Supernatural TV series)
Bugo (Devilman)

C
Cacodemon (Doom video game series)
Cadaver (Darren Shan, The Demonata)
Cagnazzo (Dante's Inferno)
Cain (Supernatural TV show)
Calcabrina (Dante's Inferno)
Calcifer (Diana Wynne Jones, Howl's Moving Castle)
Calux (Truth or Dare (2018 film)) 
Cameron Briel (Lauren Kate Fallen series)
Canterbury (Kuroshitsuji)
Captain Hatch  (Being Human)
Casanova (Scarlet Cherie: Vampire Series)
Casey (Supernatural TV series)
Castor (Jonathan Stroud, Bartimaeus Trilogy)
Cat Head (Fionn mac Cumhaill)
Catch (Christopher Moore, Practical Demonkeeping and Lamb)
Catherine (Catherine)
Cecily (Supernatural TV series)
Cerberus (Ultrakill)
Chaos Gods (Warhammer Fantasy and Warhammer 40,000)
Charlie (Charlie Charlie Challenge, The Gallows)
Charlie Magne (Hazbin Hotel)
Chris Baker (The Good Place)
Christian Campbell (Supernatural TV series)
Chernabog (Disney, Fantasia movie)
Cherry (Sanrio character); see Berry & Cherry
Chrono (Chrono Crusade)
Chthon (Quake game)
Chzo (Chzo Mythos adventure game series)
Ciel Phantomhive (Kuroshitsuji)
Ciriatto (Dante's Inferno)
Claude Faustus (Kuroshitsuji)
Clavicus Vile (The Elder scrolls V: Skyrim)
Clockwork devils (His Dark Materials)
Clöyne (Clown)
Cole Turner (Charmed TV series)
Cordelia Chase (Angel TV series)
Costa Burra, the Death Coach (Strange)
Cow Head (Japanese mythology)
Crowley (Neil Gaiman and Terry Pratchett, Good Omens)
The Creeper (Jeepers Creepers)
The Crimson King (Stephen King Dark Tower series)
The Crone (Charmed TV series)
The Crossroads Demon (Supernatural TV series)
Crowley (Supernatural TV series)
Lord Crum (Conan the Destroyer)
Cryto (Charmed TV series)
C.W. Saturn, from Elliot S. Maggin's 1981 Superman novel, Miracle Monday
Cyberdemon/Harbinger of Doom (Doom video game series, Wolfenstein RPG)

D
D'Hoffryn (Buffy the Vampire Slayer TV series)
Dabura (Dragon Ball Z)
Daddy Dearest (Friday Night Funkin')
Dagda Mor (Elfstones of Shannara)
Dagon (Supernatural TV series)
Dahak (Xena: Warrior Princess)
Dai Gui (Jackie Chan Adventures TV series)
Dai Shi (Power Rangers Jungle Fury)
Damien Thorn (The Omen film series)
The Dancing Pig (Le cochon danseur)
Dante (Demon Lord Dante)
Dante (Devil May Cry action video game)
Dark Heart (Care Bears Movie II: A New Generation)
Dark Lord Hum Gree (Warioware Gold)
Dark Mind (Kirby & the Amazing Mirror)
Dark Nebula (Kirby: Squeak Squad)
Dark One (The Binding of Isaac: Rebirth)
Daruni (Devilman)
Darkar (Winx Club)
The Dark Overlords of the Universe (Howard the Duck film & comics)
The Deadites (The Evil Dead films)
Dean Winchester (Supernatural)
Decarbia (Lineage II)
Deformed Flesh Demons (Jacob's Ladder)
Delrith (RuneScape online role-playing game)
Demi-fiend (Shin Megami Tensei III: Nocturne)
Demise (The Legend of Zelda: Skyward Sword)
Demogorgon (Prince of Demons) (Dungeons and Dragons)
The Demon (Mirrors)
The Demon (Rock & Rule movie)
Demon Hipster Chicks (Scott Pilgrim vs. the World film)
The Demon Shredder (Teenage Mutant Ninja Turtles)
The Demonata (The Demonata)
Demoninja (Kingdom of Loathing)
Demonita (Darna)
The Demons (Anastasia)
Devi Devi (Panyo Panyo Di Gi Charat)
Diablo (Diablo series and Heroes of the Storm)
 Diabolico (Power Rangers Lightspeed Rescue)
Dipper (Supernatural TV series)
The Djinn (Wishmaster)
Dodge (Locke & Key)
Dorango (Devilman)
Dormammu (Marvel's Doctor Strange, Comics and MCU Movies)
Doviculus (Brütal Legend)
Doyle (Angel)
Draghinazzo (Dante's Inferno)
Drago (Jackie Chan Adventures TV series)
Drawcia (Kirby: Power Paintbrush)
Dread Knight (Doom video game series)
Dretch (Dungeons & Dragons fantasy game)
Drexel (Supernatural TV series)
Druaga (The Tower of Druaga)
The Dubyukk (Strange)
Duke (Supernatural TV series)
Dumain (Charmed TV series)
The Dunamez (G.P. Taylor, Shadowmancer)
Duriel (Diablo series)
Durin's Bane (J. R. R. Tolkien's The Lord of the Rings)

E
Ebain (Devilman)
Eddie (Guilty Gear)
Edgar Reese (Fallen)
Eraser (Maximum Ride series)
Etna (Disgaea)
Etrigan (DC Comics)
Evil (Time Bandits)
Alien Empera (Ultraman Mebius, Ultra Series)
Estarrosa (Nanatsu No Taizai)
Elder Toguro (Yu Yu Hakusho)
Evelynn (League of Legends)

F
The Fallen (The Binding of Isaac and The Binding of Isaac: Rebirth)
The Fallen (Devil May Cry 3)
Faquarl (Jonathan Stroud, Bartimaeus Trilogy)
Farfarello (Dante's Inferno)
Fecor (Shakugan no Shana)
Femur (Darren Shan, The Demonata)
Firebrand (Ghosts 'n Goblins video game series; Gargoyle's Quest, Gargoyle's Quest II, and Demon's Crest video games)
Foot Mystics (Teenage Mutant Ninja Turtles)
Forbesii (Shuffle!)
Freddy Krueger (A Nightmare on Elm Street)
The Friends on the Other Side (The Princess and the Frog)
Frosts (Devil May Cry)
Furfur (Umineko no Naku Koro Ni)
Fyrus, Twilit Igniter (The Legend of Zelda: Twilight Princess)

G
Gaap (Umineko no Naku Koro Ni)
Gahrumble (WarioWare Gold)
Gargoyle (Doom video game series)
Gary (Andy Hamilton, Old Harry's Game BBC radio comedy)
Gayle (The Good Place)
Geeraard de Duivel (Geeraard the Devil) (The Adventures of Nero)
Gelmar (Devilman)
Gerald (Supernatural TV series)
Ghirahim (The Legend of Zelda: Skyward Sword)
Ghoulies (Ghoulies film series)
Frederick Gideon (Locke & Key)
The Glashan (G.P. Taylor, Shadowmancer)
Cliff Ghasts (His Dark Materials)
Girlfriend (Friday Night Funkin')
The Gloamglozer (The Edge Chronicles)
Gnoolies (Charlie and the Great Glass Elevator)
The God Hand (Berserk)
Golgothan #### Demon (Dogma)
Gothmog (J. R. R. Tolkien's The Silmarillion)
Gozer (Ghostbusters)
Grab (Supernatural TV series)
The Grand High Witch, (Roald Dahl's The Witches) 
Gregor (Darren Shan, The Demonata)
The Griever (Darksiders)
Griffith (Berserk)
Griffon (Devil May Cry)
Griselbrand (Magic: the Gathering)
Guthrie (Supernatural TV series)
Guy (Supernatural TV series)
Galland (Nanatsu No Taizai)
Gwydion "Rune" Felton-Hunter (Scarlet Cherie: Vampire Series)

H
Halfrek (Buffy the Vampire Slayer)
Hannah Anafeloz (Kuroshitsuji)
Harrington (Supernatural TV series)
Har'lakk the Riftsplitter (RuneScape online role-playing game)
Hastur (Cthulhu Mythos multiple-author fiction)
Hastur (Neil Gaiman and Terry Pratchett, Good Omens)
Hecaitomix (Blair Witch (video game series))
Hel Harington (Fox Spirit)
Hell Knight (Doom video game series)
Hellboy (Hellboy comic book series)
Hellspawns from the Spawn comic book series.
Daimon Hellstrom (Marvel Comics), a.k.a. Hellstorm and the Son of Satan
Henrietta Knowby (Evil Dead II)
Hessian Horseman (Sleepy Hollow movie)
Hexxus (Ferngully: The Last Rainforest)
Hezrou (Dungeons & Dragons fantasy game)
Hideous Mass (Ultrakill)
Hiei (Yu Yu Hakusho)
HIM (The Powerpuff Girls)
Hnikarr (Sarah Rees Brennan, The Demon's Lexicon)
Homura Akemi (Puella Magi Madoka Magica)
Horace Pinker (Shocker)
Hot Stuff the Little Devil (Harvey Comics)
Hsi Wu (Jackie Chan Adventures TV series)
Hugh Crain (The Haunting)
Hunson Abadeer (Adventure Time)
Husk(Hazbin Hotel)

I
 Iblis (Blue Exorcist)
Idol (Ultrakill)
Ifrit  (Final Fantasy series)
 Illidan (Warcraft and Heroes of the Storm)
Illuge (Devilman)
Imp (Doom video game series)
The Imprisoned/Demise (The Legend of Zelda: Skyward Sword)
Infernal (City of Heroes)
InuYasha (InuYasha)
Izual (Diablo series)
Icon of Sin (Doom (franchise))

J
Jabberwocky (Shakespeare Sister's Grimm books)
Jabor (Jonathan Stroud, Bartimaeus Trilogy)
Jack Ferriman (Ghost Ship movie)
Jael (Supernatural TV series)
Jakabok Botch (Clive Barker, Mister B. Gone)
Jan Valek (Vampires)
Janemba (Dragon Ball Z: Fusion Reborn)
Japhrimel (Dante Valentine fantasy)
Jaraxxus (World of Warcraft)
Jason Voorhees (Friday the 13th)
Jedah Dohma (Darkstalkers) 
Jennifer Check (Jennifer's Body horror film)
Jervis (Supernatural TV series)
Jezebel Mephistopheles (Saints Row Gat Out of Hell)
Jinmen (Devilman)
Joey Atkins (Strange)
Josefel Zatanos (Coffin Joe trilogy)
Judgment (Helltaker)
Judge Holden (Blood Meridian)
Juiblex (Dungeons & Dragons role-playing game)
Jungler (Deliver Us From Evil crime-horror film)
Jun Fudo (Devil Lady)
Justice (Helltaker)

K
K'ril Tsutsaroth (RuneScape online role-playing game)
Kaa Jinn (Strange)
Kagura (Demon Love Spell)
Kal'Ger the Warmonger (RuneScape online role-playing game)
Kashies Lee (Teenage Mutant Ninja Turtles)
Kayako Saeki (Ju-On film series)
Ke'Oth (Adventure Time)
DCI Jim Keats (Ashes to Ashes TV series)
Khorne (Warhammer Fantasy and Warhammer 40,000)
Kil'jaeden the Deceiver (Warcraft series)
Kildor (Beast Quest)
Killabilly (Lollipop Chainsaw)
Killer BOB (Twin Peaks)
Kip (Supernatural TV series)
Kneesocks (Panty & Stocking with Garterbelt)
Koakuma (Touhou Project)
Koroviev (Mikhail Bulgakov, The Master and Margarita)
Korrok (David Wong, John Dies at the End novel)
Kragos (Beast Quest)
Krampus (The Binding of Isaac and The Binding of Isaac: Rebirth)
Kronos (In Nomine role-playing game)
Kurama (Yu Yu Hakusho)
Kuruma (Nine Tails Fox)(Naruto)

L
Lacock (Devilman)
Lafleur (Devilman)
Laharl (Disgaea)
Lala (Devilman)
Lamia (Drag Me to Hell)
The Landscaper (Kingdom of Loathing)
Laplace's Demon
Lasciel (Dresden Files)
Leviathan (Umineko no Naku Koro Ni)
Leviathan (Ultrakill)
Libicocco (Dante's Inferno)
Ligur (Neil Gaiman and Terry Pratchett, Good Omens)
Lilith (multiple works)
Lipstick-Face Demon (Insidious)
Little Horn (The Binding of Isaac: Afterbirth)
Little Nicky (Little Nicky)
Loc-Nar (Heavy Metal)
Loki (The Binding of Isaac and The Binding of Isaac: Rebirth)
Lokii (The Binding of Isaac: Wrath of the Lamb and The Binding of Isaac: Rebirth)
Lothario (Scarlet Cherie: Vampire Series)
Lola (Supernatural TV series)
Loona (Helluva Boss)
Longhorn Golkonda (Lineage II) 
The Lord Of Bones (Darksiders II)
Lord of Darkness (Legend)
Lord English (Homestuck)
Lord Loss (Darren Shan, The Demonata)
Lord Tirek (Rescue at Midnight Castle), (My Little Pony: Friendship is Magic)
Lorne (Angel)
Luci (Disenchantment)
Lucifer (multiple works)
Lucifer Morningstar (DC Comics)
Lucius Heinous VII (Jimmy Two-Shoes)

M
Demon King Maarg (The Riftwar Cycle series)
Madama Butterfly (Bayonetta)
Madama Khepri (Bayonetta)
Madama Styx (Bayonetta)
Maderas (Disgaea)
Mail daemon (NetHack)
Majin Buu (Dragon Ball anime series)
Majora (The Legend of Zelda: Majora's Mask)
Makima (Chainsaw Man)
Mal'Ganis (Warcraft series and Heroes of the Storm)
Malacoda (Dante's Inferno)
Malebolgia (Spawn)
Maledict (Doom 3: Resurrection of Evil)
Malfegor (Magic: The Gathering)
Malice (The Demonata)
Malice (Fortnite: Battle Royale)
Malicious Face (Ultrakill)
Malina (Helltaker)
Malhyne (Fading of the Cries)
Mama (Mama movie)
Mammon (multiple works)
The Manager (Stephen King's The Shining)
Mancubus (Doom video game series)
Mannoroth the Destructor (Warcraft series)
Marauder (Doom Eternal video game)
Marbas (The Priests)
Marceline Abadeer (Adventure Time)
Mard Geer (Fairy Tail)
Marilith (Dungeons & Dragons fantasy game)
Mary Shaw (Dead Silence)
Masselin (Charmed TV series)
Mathias (Fading of the Cries)
Mazikeen (The Sandman and Lucifer as comic-book and TV-series)
Meg Masters  (Supernatural TV series)
Mega Satan (The Binding of Isaac: Rebirth)
Mehrunes Dagon (Elder Scrolls IV: Oblivion)
Meliodas (nanatsu no taizai)
Melkor, a.k.a. Morgoth (J. R. R. Tolkien's The Silmarillion)
The Men with Sticks and Ropes (Being Human)
Mephiles the Dark (Sonic the Hedgehog series)
Mephisto (Diablo and Heroes of the Storm)
Mephisto Pheles (Blue Exorcist)
Mephisto (Marvel)
Mephisto or Mephistopheles (multiple works)
Mephistroth (Warcraft series)
Mercutio (AdventureQuest Worlds online role-playing game)
Mermaim (Devilman)
Michael (The Good Place)
MIKE (Twin Peaks)
Millie (Helluva Boss)
Milan Incubi (Strange)
Minion (Twisted Metal)
Minos (Beast Quest)
Morrigan Aensland (Darkstalkers)
Modeus (Helltaker)
Molag Bal (The Elder Scrolls series)
Mommy Mearest (Friday Night Funkin')
Mother (Scarlet Cherie: Vampire Series)
Mourn (Kingdom of Loathing)
Moxxie (Helluva Boss)
Mundus, Demon King (Devil May Cry)
Muzan Kibutsuji (Demon Slayer: Kimetsu no Yaiba)

N
N'zall (Eoin Colfer, Artemis Fowl novel series)
N°1 (Eoin Colfer, Artemis Fowl novel series)
Nadia Moore (The Demonata)
Nalfeshnee (Dungeons & Dragons fantasy game)
The Nameless Demon (Strange)
Nanatoo (The Mighty Boosh)
Narvarog (Fablehaven)
Natsu (Fairy Tail)
Nausizz (Crossed Swords video game)
Nebiroth (Super Ghouls'n Ghosts)
Necrodeus (Kirby Mass Attack)
Nelo Angelo (Devil May Cry)
Nerine (Shuffle!)
Nezuko Kamado (Demon Slayer: Kimetsu no Yaiba)
Nero (Devil May Cry 4)
Neuro Nōgami (Majin Tantei Nōgami Neuro)
Nevermore (Dota 2, as Shadow Fiend)
Newt (Kim Harrison, Hollows print series)
Niffty (Hazbin Hotel)
Nightmare (Kirby's Adventure)
Nightmare (Devil May Cry)
The Nightmare (The Legend of Zelda: Link's Awakening)
Noi Tai Dar from Teenage Mutant Ninja Turtles Adventures series
Nouda (Jonathan Stroud, Bartimaeus Trilogy)
Null (Teenage Mutant Ninja Turtles Adventures)
Nurgle (Warhammer Fantasy and Warhammer 40,000)
Nyarlathotep (Cthulhu Mythos)

O
Odio (Live A Live)
Oyashiro (07th Expansion, Higurashi When They Cry visual novel series)
Ozhin (Countdown (2019 film))
Ob Nixilis (Magic: the Gathering)

P
Paimon (Hereditary)
Pandemonica (Helltaker)
Pazuzu (The Exorcist)
Peaches (Rocko's Modern Life) 
Phantasmaraneae (Bayonetta)
Phantom (Devil May Cry)
 Phlebiac Brothers (Spawn)
Pinhead (Hellraiser)
Pinky (Doom video game series)
Po Kong (Jackie Chan Adventures TV series)
Psaro (Dragon Quest IV: Chapters of the Chosen)
Psycho Jenny (Devilman)
Pumpkinhead (Pumpkinhead)
Pursuers (Chrono Crusade)
Pyramid Head (Silent Hill)
Pain Elemental (Doom video game series)

Q
Quan chi (Mortal Kombat)
Quasami, Warrior Devil (Strange)
Quasit (Dungeons & Dragons fantasy game)
Queen Akasha {Queen of the Damned}
Queen Bansheera (Power Rangers Lightspeed Rescue)
Queezle (Jonathan Stroud, Bartimaeus Trilogy)
Quitoon (Clive Barker, Mister B. Gone)
Qwan (Eoin Colfer, Artemis Fowl novel series)
Qweffor (Eoin Colfer, Artemis Fowl novel series)

R
Rakdos (Magic: the Gathering)
Ramiel (Supernatural TV series)
Ramuthra (Jonathan Stroud, Bartimaeus Trilogy)
Randall Flagg (Stephen King, The Stand and other works)
Raven (DC Comics)
Raul (Supernatural TV series)
Ravira (Beast Quest)
Razgriz (Ace Combat 5: The Unsung War)
Red (WarioWare: Touched!)
Red (All Dogs Go to Heaven 2)
Red Guy (Cow and Chicken)
Revenant (Doom video game series)
Rias Gremory (High School DxD)
Rin Okumura (Blue Exorcist)
Robot Devil (Futurama)
Rock Demons (The Edge Chronicles)
Ronove (Umineko no Naku Koro Ni)
Rosier (Karen Chance, The Cassandra Palmer series)
Rubicante (Dante's Inferno)
Ruby (Supernatural TV series)
Rufio the Magnificent (Dungeons & Dragons fantasy game)

S
Samael (The Mortal Instruments series)
Samhain (Supernatural TV series)
Sammael the Desolate One, a.k.a. the Lord of Resurrection (Hellboy)
Sardius (Super Ghouls'n Ghosts)
Sargeras (Warcraft)
Satan (multiple works)
Sauron (J. R. R. Tolkien's The Lord of the Rings and The Silmarillion)
Savanti Romero (Teenage Mutant Ninja Turtles)
Scanty (Panty & Stocking with Garterbelt)
The Scarlet King (SCP Foundation)
Scarlet Van Halisha (Lineage II)
Scarmiglione (Dante's Inferno)
Screwtape (C.S. Lewis, The Screwtape Letters)
Scumspawn (Andy Hamilton, Old Harry's Game BBC radio comedy)
SCP-166 (SCP Foundation)
Sebastian Michaelis (Kuroshitsuji)
Seloth (G.P. Taylor, Shadowmancer)
Sesshomaru (InuYasha)
Seylos (Amon: The Darkside of the Devilman)
Shadows (Devil May Cry)
Shadow Men (White Noise film)
Shawn (The Good Place)
Sierra (Supernatural TV series)
Simmons (Supernatural TV series)
Shax (Charmed TV series)
Shelob (J. R. R. Tolkien's The Lord of the Rings)
Shendu (Jackie Chan Adventures TV series)
Silene (Devilman)
Silitha (Darksiders)
Simon Cartwright (The Ugly)
Sinners (Chrono Crusade)
Slaanesh (Warhammer Fantasy and Warhammer 40,000)
Sock (Welcome to Hell animation)
The Source of All Evil (Charmed TV series)
Sparda (Hideki Kamiya, Devil May Cry video game series)
Spawn (Image Comics)
Spider Mastermind (Doom video game series)
Spine (The Demonata)
Stolas Goetia (Helluva Boss)
Straga (Darksiders)
Sven Golly (Kingdom of Loathing)
The Stygian (Darksiders)
Sylathus (Fading of the Cries)
Sytry (Also known as Sitri) (Devils and Realist)

T
Takeo Saeki (Ju-on film series)
Tathamet (Diablo)
The Tall Man (Charmed)
The Tall Man (Phantasm)
Tash, (C.S. Lewis' The Chronicles of Narnia)
Tchang Zu (Jackie Chan Adventures TV series)
Tchernabog (Blood video game)
Te Kā (Disney, Moana movie)
Tempus (Charmed TV series)
Terrorblade (Dota 2 video game)
Texsch (Devilman)
Thammaron (RuneScape online role-playing game)
The Great Leviathan (Yu-Gi-Oh!)
The Lich (Adventure Time)
The Omega (Ninjago: Masters of Spinjitzu)
The Overlord (Ninjago: Masters of Spinjitzu)
Thomas "Boss" Mutton (Catherine)
Thompson (Kuroshitsuji)
Thulsa Doom (Conan the Barbarian)
Thura (Fading of the Cries)
Tiamat (Darksiders)
Timber (Kuroshitsuji)
Titan (Doom video game series)
To'Kash the Bloodchiller (RuneScape online role-playing game)
Toby (Paranormal Activity film series)
Tom the Demon Prince (Star vs the Forces of Evil)
Tony Reno (Sometimes They Come Back Again)
Trevor (The Good Place)
Tritannus (Winx Club)
Trigon (DC Comics)
Trish (Devil May Cry)
Tso Lan (Jackie Chan Adventures TV series)
Turok-Han (Buffy the Vampire Slayer TV series)
Tzeentch (Warhammer Fantasy and Warhammer 40,000)

U
Ungoliant (J. R. R. Tolkien's Silmarillion)
Unicron (Transformers)
Urizen (Devil May Cry 5)

V
Valak (The Conjuring 2)
The Varrigal (G.P. Taylor Shadowmancer)
Vaggie (Hazbin Hotel)
Vein (Darren Shan, The Demonata)
Vergil (Devil May Cry)
Verosika Mayday (Helluva Boss)
Vicky Sengupta (The Good Place)
Violator (Spawn)
Void Termina (Kirby Star Allies)
Vox (Hazbin Hotel)
Valtor (Winx Club)
Vordred (AdventureQuest Worlds)
Vrinz Clortho the Keymaster (Ghostbusters)
Vrock (Dungeons & Dragons fantasy game)
Vulgrim (Darksiders)
Vulpuz (Redwall)
Vyers (Disgaea)

W
Warlock (Julian Sands, Warlock)
Welvath (Devilman)
The Wendigo, (Stephen King's Pet Sematary)
William "Maxwell" Carter (Don't Starve)
Withengar (Magic: the Gathering)
Professor Woland (Mikhail Bulgakov, The Master and Margarita)
Wormwood (C.S. Lewis, The Screwtape Letters)
Wu Tang, (Erotic Ghost Story)
WxrtHltl-jwlpklz, (Terry Pratchett, Wyrd Sisters)

X
X(an/th) (Xanth book series)
Xiao Fung (Jackie Chan Adventures TV series)

Y
Yaksha (The Last Vampire)
Yk'Lagor the Thunderous (RuneScape online role-playing game)
Yapool (Ultraman Ace, Ultraman Mebius, Ultra Fight Victory, Ultraman Retsuden, Ultra Series)
Yoko Kurama (Yu Yu Hakusho)
Yuuki Terumi (BlazBlue)
Younger Toguro (Yu Yu Hakusho)

Z
Zagred (Black Clover)
Zaldover (Devilman)
Zamiel, the Demon Huntsman (The Ride of the Demon Huntsman, Philip Pullman)
Zamiel Moloch (Slam Dunk Ernest)
Zankou (Charmed TV series)
Zann (Devilman)
Zanshin (Throne of Darkness)
Zdrada (Helltaker)
Zdim (The Fallible Fiend)
Zelloripus (Weird Dreams)
Zennon (Demon lord Dante)
Zennon (Devilman)
Zepar (Umineko no Naku Koro Ni)
Overlord Zetta (Makai Kingdom: Chronicles of the Sacred Tome)
Zoldoba (Devilman)
Zorc Necrophades the Dark One (Yu-Gi-Oh!)
Zoxim (Strange)
ZoZo (Ouija Board)
Zuboo (Devilman)
Zuul (Ghostbusters movie)
Zeldris (Nanatsu No Taizai)

See also

Christian demonology
Classification of demons
Daimon
Demon
Demonology
Devil
Devil in the arts and popular culture
Exorcism
Fallen angel
Hell
List of angels in fiction
List of theological demons
Satanism

References

Demons